The 2015 CIS Women's Volleyball Championship was held February 26, 2015 to March 1, 2015, in Toronto, Ontario, to determine a national champion for the 2014–15 CIS women's volleyball season. The tournament was played at the Goldring Centre for High Performance Sport at the University of Toronto. It was the second time that the University of Toronto had hosted the tournament, with the other instance occurring in 1996. This was the last championship tournament to be played over four days as the format shifted back to three days starting in 2016. This was also the last championship to be played in February as the CIS shifted the championship schedule two weeks ahead in 2016.

The top-seeded Canada West Champion Trinity Western Spartans defeated the second-seeded Alberta Pandas in the gold medal match to win the first women's volleyball national championship in program history. The Spartans came back from a 0–2 set deficit to win the national title in the exact same manner that they won the Canada West title – by overcoming a two-set deficit to the Alberta Pandas.

Participating teams

Championship bracket

Consolation bracket

Awards

Championship awards 
CIS Tournament MVP – Nikki Cornwall, Trinity Western
R.W. Pugh Fair Play Award – Madelyn Mandryk, Toronto

All-Star Team 
Jennifer Neilson, Toronto
Marie-Alex Bélanger, Montreal
Jessie Niles, Alberta
Dione Lang, Alberta
Nikki Cornwall, Trinity Western
Alicia Perrin, Trinity Western
Elizabeth Wendel, Trinity Western

References

External links 
 Tournament Web Site

U Sports volleyball
2015 in women's volleyball
University of Toronto